Gargi Gupta is the founder and secretary of Voice Of World (NGO), a multi-unit non-profit organization for visually impaired, disabled, and orphaned children in Eastern India, headquartered in Kolkata, India.

Life
Gupta was born in West Bengal. She finished her schooling at Kolkata and joined the Indian Railways. The city's street children were her first introduction to the conditions of the poor after the death of her parents.

Gupta started her work with six children in her father's rented house in North Kolkata. In 2018 the number of inmates was 300. It is the only privately run facility of its kind. Voice of World started its South Kolkata Centre in 1998 in another house of Prabir Gupta. Residential Kindergarten School, Braille Press and the library is located there.

In recognition of her services, Indian President Ramnath Kovind awarded Gupta with the Nari Shakti (women empowerment) award on 8 March 2018.

The charity

Voice Of World's inmates are orphan or from under-privileged families. Along with their free education they experience various sports including mountaineering and trekking. In 2018 she introduced coastal trek for disabled inmates. After completion of education of inmates, she and her NGO take care of rehabilitation of inmates, especially visually disabled girls.

Major works
 1992 She founded 'Voice of World' NGO  which works for visually impaired and disabled orphaned children in Eastern India.
1997 Started residential facility for 300 residential and 3000 non residential beneficiaries.
 2001  developed transliteration  software to transfer Bengali  word documents in to Braille. 
 Set up a home in Rishra for visually disabled women pursuing Higher Education
 Her NGO runs a Teachers training college where disabled students get scholarship

Awards and honours 
 8 March 2018: Nari Shakti Puraskar (Women Power Award), highest civilian award for women in India.

References

External links
 Gargi Gupta receiving award from President of India

Living people
20th-century Indian women
20th-century Indian people
Indian humanitarians
Indian human rights activists
Social workers
Activists from West Bengal
Indian women activists
Women educators from West Bengal
Educators from West Bengal
Women humanitarians
1961 births
People from Kolkata
Social workers from West Bengal
21st-century Indian women
21st-century Indian people